("the privilege of the white", is a term used for a Catholic custom whereby certain designated female royalty and royal consorts are permitted to wear a white dress and veil during audiences with the Pope, an exception to the tradition of most women wearing black garments on such occasions.

History
Traditionally, the protocol for papal audiences required women to wear a long black garment with long sleeves, and a black veil, the colour of which signified the virtues of piety and humility. The queens of Italy, Belgium and Spain were exempt from this rule, as were the Grand Duchess of Luxembourg, and the princesses of the House of Savoy. 

Those who are at present permitted to wear white garments include the Queens of Spain and Belgium, the Grand Duchess of Luxembourg and the Princess of Monaco, in summary those royal houses whose regents had been given the title of "(Most) Catholic Majesty" (Rex catholicissimus). 

The protocol for papal audiences formerly required that women wear a long black dress with a high collar and long sleeves, and a black mantilla. Certain designated Catholic queens and princesses have nonetheless traditionally been exempted from wearing black garments. 

The privilege is not used by the wives of all Catholic monarchs or by the wives of non-Catholic monarchs. Even though they are Catholics, it is not accorded to the Queen of Lesotho or the Princess of Liechtenstein. It is also not afforded to the wife of a male President of France, even though the French President is ex-officio Co-Prince of Andorra and his spouse is almost always at least nominally Catholic.

The privilege is also not accorded to Queen Máxima of the Netherlands, who is the Catholic wife of the Protestant King Willem-Alexander; nor to Katharine, Duchess of Kent, Princess Michael of Kent, or Sylvana, Countess of Saint Andrews, who are the senior Catholic members of the Protestant British royal family.

List of eligibility

The following living royal women are currently eligible for the privilege:

In recent years

Marina, Princess of Naples, wife of the Head of the House of Savoy, Vittorio Emanuele, Prince of Naples, used the privilege on 18 May 2003 during a Catholic mass marking the birth anniversary of Pope John Paul II.

For the first time in Monégasque history on 12 January 2013, Charlene, Princess of Monaco, used the privilege in an audience with Pope Benedict XVI. The Holy See Press Office later issued a press release declaring the following: 

 

Charlene availed the privilege again on 18 January 2016 when visiting Pope Francis as part of an official state visit to the Vatican with her husband, Albert II, Prince of Monaco.

List of occasions used

Among the occasions when the  has been exercised are the following:

References

External links

Holy See awards
Catholic religious clothing
Non-clerical religious clothing
Role status

Royal dresses
Vatican City culture
Women and the papacy
Women's clothing
Women in Vatican City